David Frederick Oakley (born 21 November 1960) is a former New Zealand cricketer. He played a few matches of first-class and List A cricket for Wellington between 1980 and 1985.

His father John played for Wellington in the 1940s.

References

External links
 

1960 births
Living people
New Zealand cricketers
Wellington cricketers
Cricketers from Wellington City